Gabriela Satková (born 2 December 2001) is a Czech slalom canoeist who has competed at the international level since 2016.

She won four medals at the ICF Canoe Slalom World Championships with two golds (C1 team: 2021, 2022) a silver (C1 team: 2018) and a bronze (C1: 2021). She also won three medals (2 golds and 1 bronze) at the European Championships.

Her older sister Martina is a wildwater and slalom canoeist.

World Cup individual podiums

References

External links

Living people
Czech female canoeists
2001 births
Medalists at the ICF Canoe Slalom World Championships
Sportspeople from Brno